Birdwell Point is the northwest point of Dean Island, lying within the Getz Ice Shelf off the coast of Marie Byrd Land. It was mapped by the United States Geological Survey from surveys and from U.S. Navy air photos, 1959–65, and named by the Advisory Committee on Antarctic Names for Keith W. Birdwell, U.S. Navy, Electronics Technician at Byrd Station, 1969.

References
 

Headlands of Marie Byrd Land